The 1903 Massachusetts gubernatorial election was held on November 3, 1903. Incumbent Republican Governor John L. Bates was re-elected to a second term, defeating Democratic nominee William A. Gaston and Socialist John C. Chase in a rematch of the 1902 election.

General election

Results

See also
 1903 Massachusetts legislature

References

Bibliography

1903
Governor
Massachusetts